Amazon CloudFront is a content delivery network (CDN) operated by Amazon Web Services. Content delivery networks provide a globally-distributed network of proxy servers that cache content, such as web videos or other bulky media, more locally to consumers, thus improving access speed for downloading the content.

CloudFront has servers located in Europe (United Kingdom, Ireland, The Netherlands, Germany, Spain), Asia (Hong Kong, Singapore, Japan, Taiwan, Vietnam, Indonesia, and India), Australia, South America, Africa, and several major cities in the United States. In November 2022, the service operated from 400 edge locations on six continents.

CloudFront operates on a pay-as-you-go basis.

CloudFront competes with larger CDNs, such as Akamai and Limelight Networks. Upon launch, Larry Dignan of ZDNet News stated that CloudFront could cause price and margin reductions for competing CDNs.

Timeline
 November 18, 2008 – Beta launch of CloudFront
 May 7, 2009 – Adds access logging capability
 November 11, 2009 – Adds support for private content
 December 15, 2009 – Announced Amazon CloudFront Streaming
 March 28, 2010 – Amazon launches edge locations in Singapore and adds private content for streaming
 May, 2014, Amazon CloudFront is included in the Free Tier usage

Amazon CloudFront edge locations 

In October 2018, Amazon CloudFront consisted of 138 access points (127 edge locations and 11 regional edge caches) in 63 cities across 29 countries.

 North America
 Edge locations: Ashburn, VA (3); Atlanta, GA (3); Boston, MA; Chicago, IL (2); Dallas/Fort Worth, TX (5); Denver, CO (2); Hayward, CA; Jacksonville, FL; Los Angeles, CA (4); Miami, FL (3); Minneapolis, MN; Montreal, QC; New York, NY (3); Newark, NJ (3); Palo Alto, CA; Philadelphia, PA; Phoenix, AZ; San Jose, CA (2); Seattle, WA (3); South Bend, IN; St. Louis, MO; Toronto, ON
 Regional Edge caches: Virginia; Ohio; Oregon

 Europe
 Edge locations: Amsterdam, The Netherlands (2); Berlin, Germany; Copenhagen, Denmark; Dublin, Ireland; Frankfurt, Germany (8); Helsinki, Finland; London, England (7); Madrid, Spain (2); Manchester, England; Marseille, France; Milan, Italy; Munich, Germany; Oslo, Norway; Palermo, Italy; Paris, France (4); Prague, Czech Republic; Stockholm, Sweden (3); Vienna, Austria; Warsaw, Poland; Zurich, Switzerland
 Regional Edge caches: Frankfurt, Germany; London, England

 Asia
 Edge locations: Bangalore, India; Chennai, India (3); Bangkok, Thailand (2); Hong Kong, China (3); Kuala Lumpur, Malaysia; Mumbai, India (2); Manila, Philippines; New Delhi, India (2); Osaka, Japan; Seoul, South Korea (4); Singapore (3); Taipei, Taiwan(3); Tokyo, Japan (9)
 Regional Edge caches: Mumbai, India; Singapore; Seoul, South Korea; Tokyo, Japan

 Australia
 Edge locations: Melbourne; Perth; Sydney
 Regional Edge caches: Sydney

 South America
 Edge locations: São Paulo, Brazil (2); Rio de Janeiro, Brazil (2)
 Regional Edge caches: São Paulo, Brazil

 Middle East
 Edge location: Dubai, United Arab Emirates; Fujairah, United Arab Emirates; Tel Aviv, Israel

 Africa
 Edge locations: Nairobi, Kenya; Johannesburg, South Africa; Cape Town, South Africa

Use cases
 Website acceleration
 Video streaming
 Content download
 Static or dynamic content

Logs
CloudFront allows users to enable or disable logging. If enabled, the logs are stored on Amazon S3 buckets which can then be analyzed. These logs contain useful information like:
 Date / time
 Edge location
 Protocol used etc.

These logs can be analyzed by using third-party tools such as S3Stat, Cloudlytics, Qloudstat, or AWStats.

References

External links

CloudFront
Content delivery networks
Computer-related introductions in 2008